The 1987 Asian Women's Handball Championship, the first Asian Championship, which was taking place from 15 to 27 August 1987 in Amman, Jordan.

Preliminary round

Group A

Group B

Placement 5th/6th

Final round

Semifinals

Bronze medal match

Gold medal match

Final standing

References

External links
Results

H
Asian Handball Championships
Asian
H
August 1987 sports events in Asia